Raymond Martin Legaspi Santiago (born July 20, 1973) is a Filipino, TV host, actor, and comedian.

Career
After making his movie debut in Viva Films' youth comedy Estudyante Blues (Student Woes), Santiago became a Viva contract artist and began making guest appearances on television programs while continuing in high school.

Among the comedy movies he appeared in were Wooly Booly: Classmate kong Alien, Wooly Booly 2: Ang Titser kong Alien and Paikot-ikot.  Not long after, Viva launched him as a junior comedian in the movie Rocky en Rolly, in which he starred opposite Jimmy Santos. The movie was a success, and he went on to Tootsie Wootsie, where he worked with Herbert Bautista and Keempee de Leon. Sometimes afterward, Santiago transitioned to action films with Angelito San Miguel: Batang City Jail, and went on to star in Magnong Rehas, Pita: Terror ng Kalookan, Noel Juico, Batang Kriminal, and Dillinger ng Dose Pares.  His last major movie as an action star was Sgt. Santos: Batang Sundalo in 2001.

In 1998, Santiago signed up as a contract star for GMA Network, which gave him his first action-sitcom, Kool Ka Lang. The sitcom was initially directed by his brother Randy who gave it up after signing on as lead host of ABS-CBN's noontime show Magandang Tanghali Bayan. Kool Ka Lang aired through 2003. Santiago then teamed with Joey Marquez, Richard Gomez and Benjie Paras in Lagot Ka, Isusumbong Kita.

Santiago later starred in his third GMA sitcom, Who's Your Daddy Now?, where he played a father role for the first time. The show ran 13 episodes. Santiago then signed to do a primetime TV series opposite Dennis Trillo and Marky Cielo, titled Zaido: Pulis Pangkalawakan. From 2008 to 2009, he starred in the action-fantasy Gagambino. which was aired on GMA Network.

In 2009, Santiago was seen in Darna, where he plays a news photographer. The following year, Santiago returned to drama via Claudine, a weekly drama miniseries on GMA Network, appearing with his real wife, Claudine Baretto-Santiago. In 2016, Santiago returned to comedy with Tsuperhero.

In 2018, Santiago transferred to ABS-CBN, after being with GMA Network for 2 decades. He will appear in upcoming drama entitled Starla, with Judy Ann Santos.

Controversy
On July 13, 2007, Santiago and his wife Claudine Barretto, admitted they did not know that Francswiss Investment —which accepted their money — was involved in a pyramid scam. Their lawyer, Ellen Veza, told NBI agents that the Barrettos had invested in Francswiss, but declined to say if they recruited other investors. Francswiss duped Filipinos of almost P1 billion.

Personal life
Santiago married actress Claudine Barretto in 2006, in Tagaytay Highlands in Tagaytay, Cavite.  The couple adopted a daughter, Sabina Natasha, at two months old in July 2004,.

Filmography

Television

Movies

TV specials

References

External links
Raymart Santiago at iGMA.tv

Filipino male child actors
Filipino male film actors
Filipino male television actors
ABS-CBN personalities
GMA Network personalities
Living people
Filipino male comedians
Viva Artists Agency
1973 births